The 1991 Valleydale Meats 500 was the sixth stock car race of the 1991 NASCAR Winston Cup Series and the 31st iteration of the event. The race was held on Sunday, April 14, 1991, before an audience of 58,300 in Bristol, Tennessee, at Bristol Motor Speedway, a 0.533 miles (0.858 km) permanent oval-shaped racetrack. The race took the scheduled 500 laps to complete. In a chaotic race, Penske Racing South driver Rusty Wallace would manage to come back from a two-lap deficit and hold off Morgan–McClure Motorsports driver Ernie Irvan to take his 19th career NASCAR Winston Cup Series victory and his first victory of the season. To fill out the top three, the aforementioned Ernie Irvan and Robert Yates Racing driver Davey Allison would finish second and third, respectively.

Background 

The Bristol Motor Speedway, formerly known as Bristol International Raceway and Bristol Raceway, is a NASCAR short track venue located in Bristol, Tennessee. Constructed in 1960, it held its first NASCAR race on July 30, 1961. Despite its short length, Bristol is among the most popular tracks on the NASCAR schedule because of its distinct features, which include extraordinarily steep banking, an all concrete surface, two pit roads, and stadium-like seating. It has also been named one of the loudest NASCAR tracks.

Entry list 

 (R) denotes rookie driver.

Qualifying 
Qualifying was originally scheduled to be split into two rounds. The first round was held on Friday, April 12, at 3:00 PM EST. Originally, the first 15 positions were going to be determined by first round qualifying, with positions 16-30 meant to be determined the following day on Saturday, April 13. However, due to rain, the second round was cancelled. As a result, the rest of the starting lineup was set using the results from the first round. Depending on who needed it, a select amount of positions were given to cars who had not otherwise qualified but were high enough in owner's points; up to two were given.  If needed, a past champion who did not qualify on either time or provisionals could use a champion's provisional, adding one more spot to the field.

Three drivers would fail to qualify.

Full qualifying results

Race results

Standings after the race 

Drivers' Championship standings

Note: Only the first 10 positions are included for the driver standings.

References 

1991 NASCAR Winston Cup Series
NASCAR races at Bristol Motor Speedway
April 1991 sports events in the United States
1991 in sports in Tennessee